Nemeritis is a genus of ichneumon wasps.

References 

 Foraging for patchily-distributed hosts by the parasitoid, Nemeritis canescens. JK Waage, The Journal of Animal Ecology, 1979
 Arrestment responses of the parasitoid, Nemeritis canescens, to a contact chemical produced by its host, Plodia interpunctella. JK WAAGE - Physiological Entomology, 1978
 Le rôle de" Nemeritis canescens" Gravenhorst dans l'infection a" Bacillus thuringiensis" Berliner chez" Ephestia kühniella" Zeller. ES Kurstak, 1965

Campopleginae
Ichneumonidae genera
Taxa named by August Holmgren